Shiva is a Hindu deity worshipped by Shaivaites in India as well as Pakistan as the destroyer of ignorance spread all across the universe. As one of the three main gods in the Hindu pantheon, there are temples dedicated to his worship in India and Pakistan as well (and abroad). The most prominent of these is the Jyotirlinga temples and Mellacheruvu Swayabhu Shambhulingeshwara Swami. In Shaivism, Shiva is the god of all and is described as worshipped by all, including Devas (gods) like Brahma, Vishnu and Indra, Asuras (demons) like Banasura and Ravana, humans like Adi Shankara and Nayanars, and creatures as diverse as Jatayu, an eagle, and Vali, an ape. Deities, rishis (sages), and grahas (planets) worshipped Shiva and established Shivalingas in various places.

A survey carried out by All Pakistan Hindu Rights Movement Pakistan revealed that out of 4280 Hindu temples in Pakistan  around 380 survived. 

New update around 700 hindu temples are now back 700/4280

Balochistan
 Las Bela District
Chandragup
Shivaharkaray near Parkai railway station

Islamabad
Saidpur village

Khyber Pakhtunkhwa

Shiva Temple and Dusehra House (partially in ruins)

 Haripur District
Shiv Mandir at Rehmania Bazar

 Mansehra District
Mansehra Shiva Temple at Chitti Gatti
Shiva Temple (now a public library)

 Nowshera District
Shiv Mandir

Punjab

 Gujranwala District
Shiv Temple at Nuinke

 Chakwal District
Katasraj Temple at Katas

 Jhelum District
Shiva Temple at Bagh Mohalla

 Lahore District
Shiv Temple at Model Town

 Rawalpindi District
Shiv Temple at Ganj Mandi, Raja Bazar

 Sargodha District
Shiv Temple at Bhera

 Sialkot District
 Shawala Teja Singh Temple at Kashmiri Mohalla

Sindh

 Dadu District
Shiva Mandir Johi at Johi

 Jacobabad District
Shive shankar Mandir at Peti Bazar

 Hyderabad district
 Shiv temple, Hyderabad

 Jamshoro District
Bhole Shankar Mandir at Kotri

 Karachi District
Bhagnari Shiv Temple, this temple is situated at Napier Quarter near Kakri Ground, Karachi District, Sindh, Pakistan.
Shankar Bhole Nath Temple, is located at Coordinates: 24°52'13.1"N 66°55'05.2"E, Mauripur, Karachi City, Sindh, Pakistan. This temple is dedicated to Shiva. There are Shiv Linga and Ganesha Idols inside the Shankar Bhole Nath Temple. The interior of the temple is beautiful with statues of Hindu deities including Lord Shiva and his Lingam, goddess Durga, elephant god Ganesha, and monkey god Hanuman.
Shiv Temple is located at Coordinates: 4°52'51.5"N 67°02'55.0"E, Shikarpur Colony, near Islamia Science College, Karachi City, Sindh, Pakistan. According to Hinduism, this temple is dedicated to God Shiva.
Shri Ratneshwar Mahadev Temple is a Hindu Temple situated at the seaside of Clifton in Karachi. It was constructed more than 300 years ago in a cave in a hill. The Grand Mela (Fair) of Lord Shiva is held for 3 days on Maha Shiva Ratri where more than 25,000 people visit the Temple for celebration and rituals every year. Just like many Muslims believe that Abdullah Shah Ghazi’s shrine next door holds the sea back from flooding the city, Hindus believe that Shiva’s third eye watches over the sea and keeps it in check. The entrance to the Shri Ratneshwar Mahadev Temple is located near the Jehangir Kothari Parade but is not easy to locate if you don't know where to look. There is a saffron flag flying overhead and three snake charmers just outside the entrance. The two inconspicuous staircase entrances downplay the grandeur of the temple, as they lead to as many as six levels below. At the end of the staircase, there is a sign allowing only Hindus to enter. This temple is the most beautiful architectural wonder in this city by the sea. Situated so near the sea, a sweet water spring at its lowest ebb is another of nature’s miracles.

 Mirpur Khas District
Shiv Temple at Heerabad
Shiv Temple at Laghari

 Qambar Shahdadkot District
Shiv Mandir 

 Sujawal District
Shiv Mandir at Takanu in Jati Sujawal 

 Tharparkar District
Anchlasar Temple, is located at Coordinate: 24°22'29.2"N 70°44'00.3"E. In the direction of North West from ‘Nagarparkar’ lies a place called ‘Anchlasar’ where there are natural springs. This temple is situated at the Karoonjhar Mountains, Anchlasar, Tharparkar District, Sindh, Pakistan. This temple is dedicated to God Shiva and a charitable rest house built by ‘Satramdasa’, where many ascetics dwell. A natural spring stemming and originating at the foot of a mountain near the old town is called ‘Zarano’ in the local dialect. There is also a cave in the mountain on the east side of Nagarparkar, which can accommodate about 25 persons. During emergencies and periods of crisis, the womenfolk was safely put in the cave and the opening of the cave was closed with stones and the men faced the enemies. This place was called as ‘Bavanji Bibo’. A Fort was built near Nagarparkar by one Shri. Govind Rai, which was leveled with the ground by the British. ‘Ghordharo’ is an ancient place near ‘Karunjar’. The place is revered as a sacred place in Sindh, it exists from Vedic times. There is a lake called ‘Lorai’. The water from this lake goes right up to ‘Katch’. There are many ancient remains in the Vicinity of ‘Ghordharo’.
Shiv Parvati Temple, is located at Coordinate: 24°44'18.7"N 69°47'57.2"E, Mithi, Tharparkar District, Sindh, Pakistan. This temple is dedicated to God Shiva and his wife Goddess Parvati. This is a very famous temple in Mithi city and also a peaceful and holiest temple in the region. This temple is very old but now rebuilt. Worship place of God Shiva. Several Lingams are placed here under Peepal Trees for worship. People regularly visit this temple. Every year a fair held at this place, most people visit and enjoy the fair.
Shiv Temple, Chelhar, is located at Coordinate: 24°59'56.8"N 69°57'20.1"E, Chelhar, Tharparkar District, Sindh, Pakistan. This temple is dedicated to God Shiva. This temple is very old, it may be built before India and Pakistan Partition. During Holi festivals people celebrating Holika Dahan. Some time ago this temple was renovated as it was in very poor condition.
Shiv Temple, Sardharo is located at Coordinate: 24°20'30.3"N 70°44'26.4"E, Sardharo village, Tharparkar District, Sindh, Pakistan. The ‘Thar’ Division in Pakistan has an expanse of twenty thousand square kilometers. During the census of this area in the year 1981 A.D., it was revealed that 0.5 million people were settled over there. Geographically, this ‘Thar’ (desert) has been created out of heaps formed from the sandy dunes, saltfish residues, and oysters from the Kutch desert and carried naturally over there over a period of years. The desert of ‘Thar’ was controlled by the ‘Rajput’s’ (a warrior community). Many rulers from Rajput dynasties such as Sodha, Sumera, Sanna, Rathod, etc. ruled here. Mahmud Ghaznavi traversed the Thar desert and came to Somnath for attacking and destroying the temple. During the British regime, one Capt. Recks studied this terrain geographically. According to him, ‘Parinagar’ was an important and large port in the pre-Christian era. A large tributary of the River Sindhu contributed its flow into the Arabian Sea. The river was called ‘Hakdi’ at that time. Subsequently, on account of the onslaught of natural calamities such as earthquakes, the river changed its course and many towns and villages vanished in the blue. The ‘Kutch’ province was created due to turmoil on account of earthquakes and subsequent drying up of the Arabian sea in parts. Sindh has many ancient legacies such as temples, Mathaslamaseries, Kunda's sacred tanks, and such other ancient holy places. The Government of Sindh had published a Gazetteer in the Sindhi language. Mr. Jagdish Rathi, a Sindhi author, sent me a few pages from this Gazetteer. These give an oblique reference to many such holy pilgrimage sites. There is a holy water tank situated at Nagarparkar which owes its origin by dint of the legendary story given in Mahabharata that Bheema kneeled down here. This Kunda admeasures 30′ x 20’ in size.
Shive and Pithoro Temple, is located at Coordinate: 24°40'20.4"N 69°43'40.3"E, Pabuhar, Tharparkar District, Sindh, Pakistan. This temple is dedicated to God Shiva.

 Thatta District
Shiv Mandir at Maheshwari Mohala

 Umerkot District
Umarkot Shiv Mandir at old Amarkot

Gallery

See also
 List of Shiva temples in India
 List of Hindu temples in Pakistan
 Hinduism in Pakistan
 Lists of Hindu temples by country
 Minorities in Pakistan
 Pakistan Hindu Council
 Persecution of Hindus in Pakistan
 Religious discrimination in Pakistan
 Hindu marriage laws in Pakistan

References
 Citations

01
Hindu temples
Pakistan